Amin Mohamed (born 21 February 1996), better known as Chunkz, is an English YouTube personality, host, entertainer and former musician. , his YouTube channel has over 2 million subscribers and 142 million video views. He is a member of the YouTube group Beta Squad.

Early life 
Mohamed was born on 21 February 1996 in north-west London. He was the youngest of five children. His parents immigrated from Somaliland in the 1990s. He is a Muslim. He studied financial maths at London Metropolitan University before dropping out in 2016 to focus on YouTube.

Career

YouTube
Mohamed registered the Chunkz account on 23 July 2015. His early YouTube videos were vlogs, as well as challenges, pranks, and more along with his friend Sharky.

He formed a duo with Yung Filly and contributed to YouTube channels.

In 2018, Mohamed won the International Somali award for best entertainer.

In 2019, Chunkz became part of the collaborative YouTube group known as the Beta Squad alongside four YouTubers: Sharky, AJ Shabeel, Kenny and Niko Omilana.

Music
Mohamed played the role of Asznee in Big Shaq's 2017 music video "Man's Not Hot". In March 2018, he, along with Michael Dapaah, helped launch a voice app built for the Google Assistant for the train ticket retailer Trainline to ease rail journey planning.

In March 2020, Mohamed released his first rap single and music video "Clean Up" with Yung Filly. In October 2020, he and Yung Filly followed it initial track by dropping their new single and music video titled "Hold".

In May 2021, Mohamed announced he was retiring from music because he believed it was incompatible with his religious beliefs.

Other ventures
In September 2020, Mohamed was announced as the co-host of the Sky Sports Saturday morning show Saturday Social. That month, he was also announced as a co-host for the extreme sports competition the Aphetor Games, which stars next-gen content creators. In December 2020, he hosted the 2020 MOBO Awards with Maya Jama.

Mohamed makes an appearance in the Amazon Original sports docuseries All or Nothing: Arsenal, which documented the club by spending time with the coaching staff and players behind the scenes both on and off the field throughout their 2021–22 season.

Charity work
In September 2020 and June 2022, Mohamed participated in the charity football event Soccer Aid.

Filmography

Discography

Awards and nominations

References

External links 
 
 

Black British male rappers
Black British television personalities
Comedy YouTubers
English actors
English entertainers
English male rappers
English people of Somali descent
Living people
Music YouTubers
Musicians from London
Rappers from London
YouTubers from London
1996 births
English YouTubers